Ptocheuusa abnormella is a moth of the family Gelechiidae. It is found from central and southern Europe to the Ural Mountains.

The wingspan is 13–15 mm. The ground colour of the forewings is dark grey-yellowish with white stripes along the veins and the outer margin. The hindwings are greyish. Adults are on wing in June and July.

The larvae feed on the inflorescence of Inula ensifolia.

References

Moths described in 1854
Ptocheuusa
Moths of Europe